Four Corners is a neighborhood and census-designated place (CDP) in Montgomery County, Maryland, United States. Many residents consider the neighborhood a part of Silver Spring, to whose CDP it belonged until 2010. It had a population of 8,316 at the 2020 census.

Location
Four Corners is bounded by Dennis Avenue to the northwest, the Northwest Branch Trail to the northeast, and Interstate 495 (Capital Beltway) to the south. It borders the neighborhoods of Woodmoor and Indian Spring Village, Franklin Knolls, Indian Spring Terrace, North Hills Sligo Park, and Burnt Mills Hills. The community of Northwood Park is also considered to be part of the Four Corners neighborhood, and is commonly known as Northwood-Four Corners or simply North Four Corners.

Landmarks
Montgomery Blair High School (MBHS) is a public high school named after Montgomery Blair, the son of Francis Preston Blair, the founder of Silver Spring. Blair, a lawyer, represented Dred Scott in his United States Supreme Court case, and served as Postmaster General under President Abraham Lincoln. The school is nationally recognized for its magnet program and Communication Arts Program (CAP).

The Polychrome Historic District is a national historic district in the Four Corners neighborhood. It recognizes a group of five houses built by John Joseph Earley in 1934 and 1935.

The land that comprises North Four Corners Park was acquired in the mid-1940s. It was a plot of land for temporary homes for the military during World War II. It was a whites-only neighborhood for a short while. The park grew in size to 14 acres in 1998. The park features a recreation building, playground, ballfields, tennis courts, and a picnic area.

A number of historic homes exist in North Four Corners. These include the Silver Spring 1939 World’s Fair Home (House No. 15 in the 'Town of Tomorrow'), and the brick Tudor Revival Washington Gas Model Home that opened the 1938 building program in Northwood Park.

History

In the 1700s, a water mill was built at the easternmost corner of Four Corners, where today's Colesville Road passes over the Northwest Branch of the Anacostia River and becomes Columbia Pike. The mill building burned down in 1788, hence the name Burnt Mills. Rebuilt in the late 1700s or early 1800s, ownership of the mill changed hands several times in the 19th century before closing down in the early years of the 20th century. The land was then donated to the Boy Scouts of America, who established a camp named for President Woodrow Wilson. In the early 1920s, the Boy Scouts donated part of the land to the Washington Suburban Sanitary Commission, and a temporary water filtration plant was erected at the site. Work on a new plant was completed in 1936, and the plant was named for the Washington Suburban Sanitary Commission's chief engineer, Robert B. Morse Filtration Plant. The dam and the two Georgian Revival pump houses were acquired by the Maryland-National Capital Park and Planning Commission between 1996 and 2000 and are now on the Historic Register.  The Burnt Mills Dam parks (East and West) are a popular starting point for hikers of the Northwest Branch Trail, part of the Rachel Carson Greenway, whose northernmost section runs along the eastern and northern border of the neighborhood.

In the 19th century, there was an agricultural community located at the crossroads on the Bladensburg and Colesville Roads. The community remained rural until the post-World War I building boom in suburban Montgomery County. Four Corners came into being as a residential neighborhood between the world wars, beginning in the late 1930s with the development of Northwood Park, Woodmoor, Indian Spring Village, Indian Spring Terrace, North Hills of Sligo Park, and Fairway. These subdivisions expanded between 1945 and 1955 even as new ones, such as Northwood and Franklin Knolls, were constructed. The single-family house subdivisions that soon surrounded Four Corners had winding streets that formed an irregular grid in between major roads. Four Corners was largely developed by the late 1950s.

Transportation
Four Corners is served by Metrobus numbers Z6, Z8, C2, and C4, as well as Ride On numbers 8, 9, and 19. Washington Metro service is available on the Red Line at the nearby Wheaton and Silver Spring stations. The Piney Branch Road station of the Purple Line will be built in nearby Long Branch at the intersection of University Boulevard and Piney Branch Road and is expected to be open to the public by 2023.

Demographics

As of the 2010 United States Census, the racial makeup of Four Corners was 67% White, 12.6% African American, 0% Native American or Alaska Native, 7.2% Asian, 0% Native Hawaiian or Pacific Islander, and 4.1% mixed race. Hispanics and Latinos of any race were 17.7% of the population. Non-Hispanic whites were 59.8% of the population.

References

 
Neighborhoods in Montgomery County, Maryland
Outer Silver Spring, Maryland